Russatus nigrescens is a species of small air-breathing land snail, a terrestrial pulmonate gastropod mollusk in the family Charopidae. This species is endemic to Micronesia.

References

Fauna of Micronesia
Russatus
Taxonomy articles created by Polbot